François Goyet (born 4 November 1994) is a French field hockey player who plays as a midfielder for Belgian Hockey League club Gantoise and the French national team.

Club career
In club competition, Goyet plays for Gantoise in the Belgian Hockey League. He joined Gantoise in 2019 after having played for Saint Germain in France.

International career

Under–21
François Goyet debuted for the French under-21 team in 2014 at the EuroHockey Junior Championship in Waterloo.

Senior national team
Following his junior debut, Goyet made his first appearance for Les Bleus in 2014 during a test series against Ireland in Wattignies.

In 2018, Goyet was a member of the national team at the FIH World Cup in Bhubaneswar.

Goyet won his first major medal with the senior team in 2019 at the FIH Series Finals in Le Touquet, taking home a gold medal.

He was named in the French squad for season three of the FIH Pro League.

References

External links
 
 

1994 births
Living people
French male field hockey players
Male field hockey midfielders
2018 Men's Hockey World Cup players
Men's Belgian Hockey League players
La Gantoise HC players
Place of birth missing (living people)
2023 Men's FIH Hockey World Cup players